The women's foil competition in fencing at the 2012 Olympic Games in London was held on 28 July at the ExCeL Exhibition Centre.

The medalists were all from Italy. Elisa Di Francisca won the gold medal, beating Arianna Errigo in the final, while Valentina Vezzali took bronze.

Schedule 
All times are British Summer Time (UTC+1)

Results

Finals

Top half

Section 1

Section 2

Bottom half

Section 3

Section 4

Results

References

Women's foil
2012 in women's fencing
Women's events at the 2012 Summer Olympics